WRCA (1330 kHz) is a commercial AM radio station licensed to Watertown, Massachusetts, and serving the Greater Boston media market.  The license is held by the Beasley Media Group, LLC, part of the Beasley Broadcast Group, Inc.  WRCA is simulcast with WNBP 1450 AM Newburyport and carries financial news from Bloomberg Radio with some local news, weather and traffic reports.

WRCA is powered at 25,000 watts by day and 17,000 watts at night.  It uses a directional antenna with a five-tower array off Saw Mill River Parkway in Newton, near the Charles River.  WRCA's programming is also heard on FM translator W291CZ at 106.1 MHz in Boston.   It is also broadcast on the HD2 digital subchannel of sister station 92.9 WBOS.

History

The station began operating as WCRB on January 30, 1948, owned by Theodore Jones's Charles River Broadcasting (hence the WCRB call letters).  WCRB was originally a community radio station for Waltham, Massachusetts, before switching to a classical music format a few years later.  An FM simulcast was added in 1954, WCRB-FM.  As FM broadcasting became more popular for music listening, the AM station ceased simulcasting WCRB-FM's classical format in 1975 and became WHET, programming a big band/adult standards format from 1975 until 1978, and then a short run as a beautiful music outlet.  Sales of the station to various owners led to formats such as country music WDLW for most of the 1980s, and then "Showbiz Radio" WRCA (standing for "Radio, Comedy, and Arts") in 1990 before the station began leasing time to ethnic broadcasters in 1991 with the WRCA call sign retained.  The current owners, the Beasley Broadcast Group, took over in 2000 from the ADD Radio Group.

The station's long time transmitter site in Waltham was discontinued in 2007 when WRCA became one of three AM stations to share a rebuilt transmitter facility at the original site of WBOS AM 1600 on Sawmill Brook Parkway in Newton.  This site is now used by stations on 1200, 1330 and 1600 kHz.

WRCA's city of license changed from Waltham to Watertown in 2007, and the power increased to 25,000 watts daytime, 17,000 watts nighttime.  In addition to ethnic programming, WRCA broadcast Northeastern Huskies men's ice hockey games.

Following Beasley's acquisition of Greater Media, WRCA went dark on November 15, 2016, as it moved to new studios; it returned in May 2017 with a simulcast of "Boston's Irish Channel", the HD2 channel of sister station WBQT, as it was believed that WRCA was in the process of signal testing.  The station was also paired with an FM translator, W291CZ (licensed to Boston) at 106.1 MHz.

On July 3, 2017, Bloomberg L.P. and Beasley announced that WRCA/W291CZ would begin carrying Bloomberg Radio programming (which moved over from WXKS) beginning the following day. Concurrently, the HD2 channel of WBOS began to simulcast WRCA's programming.

Translator

References

External links
Official website

FCC History Cards for WDLW (WRCA)

Watertown, Massachusetts
Radio stations established in 1948
RCA
Mass media in Middlesex County, Massachusetts
Beasley Broadcast Group radio stations
Business talk radio stations
Business mass media in the United States
1948 establishments in Massachusetts